Calidota bahamensis is a moth of the family Erebidae. It was described by Walter Rothschild in 1933. It is found on the Bahamas.

References

Phaegopterina
Moths described in 1933